Irene Alt (born 5 October 1957) is a German politician for the Alliance 90 / The Greens and was minister for family affairs in the federal state of Rhineland-Palatinate from 2011 to 2016.

Life and politics

Alt was born 1957 in the Saarlandian town of Völklingen and became member of the Greens in 1998.

Alt was minister for family affairs from 2011 to 2016. Her successor was Anne Spiegel.

References

1957 births
Living people
People from Völklingen
Alliance 90/The Greens politicians
21st-century German politicians
21st-century German women politicians
Women ministers of State Governments in Germany
Women government ministers of Germany